1776 is a musical with music and lyrics by Sherman Edwards and a book by Peter Stone. The show is based on the events leading up to the signing of the Declaration of Independence, telling a story of the efforts of John Adams to persuade his colleagues to vote for American independence and to sign the document.

The show premiered on Broadway in 1969, earning warm reviews, and ran for 1,217 performances. The production won three Tony Awards, including Best Musical.  In 1972, it was made into a film adaptation. It was revived on Broadway in 1997, and again in 2022 with a cast made up of people who identify as female, trans, and non-binary.

History 
In 1925, Rodgers and Hart wrote a musical about the American Revolution called Dearest Enemy. In 1950, a musical about the Revolution was presented on Broadway, titled Arms and the Girl, with music by Morton Gould, lyrics by Dorothy Fields, and book by Herbert Fields, Dorothy Fields and Rouben Mamoulian, the show's director.

Sherman Edwards, a writer of pop songs with several top 10 hits in the late 1950s and early '60s, spent several years developing lyrics and libretto for a musical based on the signing of the Declaration of Independence. Edwards recounted that "I wanted to show [the founding fathers] at their outermost limits. These men were the cream of their colonies. ... They disagreed and fought with each other. But they understood commitment, and though they fought, they fought affirmatively."  Producer Stuart Ostrow recommended that librettist Peter Stone collaborate with Edwards on the book of the musical.  Stone recalled, The minute you heard ["Sit Down, John"], you knew what the whole show was. ... You knew immediately that John Adams and the others were not going to be treated as gods or cardboard characters, chopping down cherry trees and flying kites with strings and keys on them. It had this very affectionate familiarity; it wasn't reverential. Adams, the outspoken delegate from Massachusetts, was chosen as the central character, and his quest to persuade all 13 colonies to vote for independence became the central conflict. Stone confined nearly all of the action to Independence Hall and the debate among the delegates, featuring only two female characters, Abigail Adams and Martha Jefferson, in the entire musical. After tryouts in New Haven, Conn., and Washington, D.C. the show opened on Broadway at the 46th Street Theatre on March 16, 1969. Peter Hunt directed.

Synopsis 
NOTE: The show can be performed in one or two acts.

Act I 

On May 8, 1776, in Philadelphia, the Second Continental Congress proceeds with its business. John Adams, the widely disliked delegate from Massachusetts, is frustrated because Congress will not even debate his proposals on independence. The other delegates, preoccupied with the rising heat, implore him to "Sit Down, John." Adams denounces the do-nothing Congress ("Piddle, Twiddle, and Resolve"), then reads the latest missive to his loving wife Abigail, who speaks to him in his imagination ("Till Then"). Later that day, Adams meets delegate Benjamin Franklin, who suggests that, because Adams is unpopular, he should let another delegate propose a resolution on independence. Richard Henry Lee of Virginia enters, having been summoned by Franklin; Adams and Franklin persuade Lee to ask the Virginia House of Burgesses to authorize a pro-independence resolution ("The Lees of Old Virginia").

Weeks later, new delegate Dr. Lyman Hall of Georgia arrives and is introduced to many important members of Congress, including Andrew McNair, the custodian; Stephen Hopkins of Rhode Island; Edward Rutledge of South Carolina; and Caesar Rodney of Delaware, among others. As Congress is assembled, John Hancock, the president of Congress, notes that the entire New Jersey delegation has been gone for quite some time. A gloomy letter from George Washington, commander of the Continental Army, arrives by courier, and it is read aloud by Charles Thomson, the Congressional Secretary. Comically, the proceedings are interrupted when a fire wagon passes by. Shortly thereafter,  Richard Henry Lee returns, bearing a resolution for independence. Elated, Adams seconds the motion to open debate on the resolution. 

John Dickinson of Pennsylvania, a conservative and royal apologist, immediately moves to table the debate. The vote is close, but debate is ultimately approved, prompting Dickinson to denounce the desire for independence as an overreaction to petty squabbles with Great Britain. The debate becomes more heated and personal, sparking a fight between Dickinson and Adams and causing Caesar Rodney (who is ailing from cancer) to swoon and collapse. Rodney is taken back to Delaware, leaving George Read as their delegation's sole vote. Since Read is a conservative, South Carolina's Edward Rutledge moves to quickly end the debate and vote on independence, knowing it is likely to fail. At this moment, the new delegation from New Jersey arrives, with leader John Witherspoon announcing he has explicit orders to vote for independence. Adams, now seeing a path to victory, pushes to proceed with the vote since ties are broken by Hancock and Adams believes Hancock is a firm believer in independence. 

Dickinson suddenly makes another motion: that any vote in favor of independence must be unanimous. The vote, predictably, ends in a tie, but Hancock unexpectedly votes in favor of unanimity, explaining that if the colonies are not unanimous in their opinion, loyalist colonies will be turned against pro-independence colonies, spawning a civil war.

Looking for a way to save the independence movement, Adams moves to postpone the vote to allow for the creation of a formal Declaration of Independence, that can be used in the courts of Europe to rally favor and assistance to the cause of American independence (this will also grant Adams time to persuade the anti-independence delegates to his side). Again, the vote ties; this time, Hancock votes with Adams, as many in Congress would like to have a break. Before they adjourn, John Hancock appoints a committee of Adams, Franklin, Roger Sherman of Connecticut, Robert Livingston of New York, and Jefferson to draft the declaration. The five argue about who should write the declaration ("But, Mr. Adams"), deciding on a reluctant Jefferson.

A week later, Adams and Franklin visit Jefferson, who has spent the week moping. But Adams has sent for Jefferson's beloved wife Martha. She enters, and Adams and Franklin leave the young lovers in peace.  Adams, alone, again exchanges letters with his wife Abigail ("Yours, Yours, Yours"). The next morning, Franklin and Adams ask Martha how the deeply intellectual Jefferson wooed her ("He Plays the Violin").

John Dickinson leads his congressional allies in a defense of their wealth and status ("Cool, Cool Considerate Men"). They depart, leaving Andrew McNair (the custodian), the courier, and a workman in the chamber. The courier describes how his two closest friends were killed on the same day at Lexington ("Momma Look Sharp").

Act II 

Jefferson is outside the chamber while Mr. Thomson reads the declaration to Congress. Adams and Franklin arrive, delighted: an exhibition of shooting by the Continental Army has convinced Samuel Chase, and Maryland will vote in favor of independence. They congratulate Jefferson on his work, and Franklin compares the creation of this new country to the hatching of a bird ("The Egg"). They debate which bird would best represent America; Franklin argues for the turkey, and Jefferson suggests the dove, but Adams insists on the eagle. The others resign themselves to that choice.

On June 28, Hancock asks if there are any alterations to be offered to the Declaration of Independence. Many delegates voice suggestions. Edward Rutledge of South Carolina objects to a clause condemning the slave trade. He accuses the northern colonies of hypocrisy, as they also prosper from slavery, through the Triangle Trade ("Molasses to Rum"). Rutledge leads a walk-out with the delegates from both Carolinas and Georgia. The resolve of the other delegates is broken, and most of them also leave. Adams' faith in himself is shaken. Re-reading a dispatch from Washington, Adams, now alone, wonders "Is Anybody There?"

It is now July 2. Hancock calls for the vote on the Lee Resolution. At this moment, Rodney and Thomas McKean return to Congress to assure that Delaware will vote in favor of independence. Thomson calls on each delegation. Although Pennsylvania passes on their first call, the rest of the New England and Mid-Atlantic colonies vote in favor of independence except for New York, who abstain. Rutledge again presses to have the slavery clause removed in exchange for the southern colonies voting in favor; Franklin argues they must first win independence before there is any hope of abolishing slavery, and Jefferson reluctantly strikes the passage out. North Carolina, South Carolina, and Georgia all vote "yea". On Pennsylvania's second call, Dickinson is about to announce that his colony votes "nay" when Franklin requests that the delegation be polled. Franklin votes "yea" and Dickinson votes "nay", leaving the decisive vote in the hands of James Wilson. Wilson all along has subordinated himself to Dickinson. Suddenly, fearing that he would be forever remembered as the man who prevented American independence, Wilson changes his vote and votes for independence. With twelve colonies voting in favor of independence, none against, and one colony abstaining, the resolution is unanimously passed.

Hancock proposes that no man be allowed to sit in Congress without signing the Declaration. Dickinson announces that he cannot in good conscience sign it, and still hopes for reconciliation with England; however, he resolves to join the army to fight for and defend the new nation. Adams leads Congress in a salute to Dickinson as he leaves the chamber.

On the evening of July 4, McNair rings the Liberty Bell in the background as Thomson calls each delegate to sign the Declaration. The delegates freeze in position as the Liberty Bell rings to a fevered pitch.

Productions 
After out-of-town tryouts, the original Broadway production opened on Broadway on March 16, 1969, at the 46th Street Theatre (now the Richard Rodgers Theatre) and closed on February 13, 1972, after 1,217 performances. In its three-year run, it played in three different theatres: the 46th Street, the St. James Theatre (1970) and, finally, the Majestic Theatre (1971).  The principal cast included William Daniels, Howard da Silva, Paul Hecht, Clifford David, Ronald Holgate, David Ford, Virginia Vestoff and Ken Howard. Rex Everhart, who was da Silva's understudy, replaced him on the original Broadway cast album after da Silva suffered a mild heart attack, which required him to leave the show temporarily. Betty Buckley made her Broadway debut as Martha Jefferson in the original stage production. Clifford David left the production soon after opening. He was replaced as Rutledge by David Cryer who was in turn replaced by John Cullum who became one of the few Broadway replacements in history to recreate a role on film. (Cullum was succeeded in the Broadway production by Paul-David Richards.)

The musical toured for two years in the United States and was given a London production, opening on June 16, 1970, at the New Theatre. The production starred Lewis Fiander as Adams, Vivienne Ross as Abigail Adams, Ronald Radd, Bernard Lloyd, David Kernan as Rutledge, John Quentin as Jefferson and Cheryl Kennedy as Martha Jefferson.

An Australian production, also with Lewis Fiander, opened at Her Majesty's Theatre in Melbourne on 26 June 1971 and moved to the Theatre Royal in Sydney on 11 September 1971.

1776 was revived by the Roundabout Theatre Company, opening on August 4, 1997, in a limited engagement at the Roundabout's home theater, the Criterion Center, before transferring to the George Gershwin Theatre on December 3, 1997, for a commercial run. It closed on June 14, 1998, after 333 performances and 34 previews. The production was directed by Scott Ellis with choreography by Kathleen Marshall, and featured Brent Spiner as Adams, Michael Cumpsty as Dickinson, Pat Hingle as Franklin, and Paul Michael Valley as Jefferson. Rex Everhart, who replaced Howard da Silva on the original cast album, understudied Hingle as Franklin.

The musical was produced in an Encores! City Center staged concert from March 30 to April 3, 2016. Directed by Garry Hynes, the cast starred Santino Fontana as John Adams, John Larroquette as Benjamin Franklin, John Behlmann as Thomas Jefferson, Christiane Noll as Abigail Adams, Nikki Renée Daniels as Martha Jefferson, Bryce Pinkham as John Dickinson, Alexander Gemignani as Edward Rutledge, André De Shields as Stephen Hopkins, and Jubilant Sykes as Richard Henry Lee. The cast included MacIntyre Dixon, Ric Stoneback, and Kevin Ligon reprising their roles from the 1997 revival as Andrew McNair, Samuel Chase, and George Read respectively. The production notably sported a racially diverse cast in light of the recent success of another musical about the Founding Fathers, Hamilton.

The musical was produced in Chicago, Illinois by Porchlight Music Theatre as part of their "Porchlight Revisits" series in November 2018. Directed by Michael Weber, Music Directed by Jeremy Ramey, with Musical Staging by Michelle Lauto.

A new revival of 1776 was to be staged at the American Repertory Theater (A.R.T.) in mid-2020, under the direction of Diane Paulus (Terrie and Bradley Bloom Artistic Director of A.R.T.), and then in Los Angeles at the Ahmanson Theatre, before arriving at the American Airlines Theatre, co-produced by ART and Roundabout Theatre Company. The team held a two-week workshop on Zoom in April 2020, but the production was postponed due to the COVID-19 pandemic. In June 2021, A.R.T. announced that the production, now directed by Jeffrey L. Page and Paulus, would begin performances at A.R.T. in May 2022. In April 2022 A.R.T. announced the revival cast of performers who identify as female, non-binary, and trans, and that the production would transfer to Roundabout's American Airlines Theatre in September 2022 and begin a 16-city national tour in February 2023. The show received mixed to negative reviews, with Jesse Green of The New York Times criticizing its casting, writing that it "intensifies and complicates the argument." Green also wrote of the overall production that despite "underlining one’s progressiveness a thousand times, as this 1776 does, [it] will not actually convey it better; rather it turns characters into cutouts and distracts from the ideas it means to promote."

Original casts and characters

Notable replacements
Broadway (1969-72)
Dickinson: George Hearn
Rutledge: Gary Beach
Hopkins: Edmund Lyndeck
Hall: Edmund Lyndeck

Broadway (2022)

 Adams: Kristolyn Lloyd

Music

Act I  
Overture
"Sit Down, John" – Adams and Congress
"Piddle, Twiddle and Resolve" – Adams
"Till Then" – Adams and Abigail
"The Lees of Old Virginia" – Lee, Franklin and Adams
"But, Mr. Adams" – Adams, Franklin, Jefferson, Sherman and Livingston
"Yours, Yours, Yours" –  Adams and Abigail
"He Plays the Violin" – Martha, Franklin, and Adams
"Cool, Cool, Considerate Men" – Dickinson and The Conservatives
"Momma Look Sharp" – Courier, McNair and Leather Apron

Act II  
"The Egg" – Franklin, Adams, Jefferson, and Congress
"Molasses to Rum" – Rutledge
"Compliments" – Abigail Adams
"Is Anybody There?" – Adams and Thomson
"Finale"

In the 2022 revival, the end of Act I is moved to after "He Plays the Violin".

Dramatic analysis 
Scene Three of 1776 holds the record for the longest time in a musical without a single note of music played or sung – over thirty minutes pass between "The Lees of Old Virginia" and "But Mr. Adams", the next song in the show. On the DVD commentary, Peter Stone says that he experimented with adding various songs in this section, but nothing ever worked.  During this scene, dubbed "Big Three" by cast members, musicians were allowed to leave the pit, reportedly the first time in Broadway history that they were permitted to do so in the middle of a show.  Stone also notes that people often told him that, because of the subject matter and the large amount of dialogue, 1776 should have been a conventional play rather than a musical.  Stone believes that the songs create a playful, irreverent tone that helps bring the historical characters to life.

Historical accuracy 
According to The Columbia Companion to American History on Film, historical "[i]naccuracies pervade 1776, though few are very troubling."  Because Congress was held in secrecy and there are no contemporary records on the debate over the Declaration of Independence, the authors of the play created the narrative based on later accounts and educated guesses, inventing scenes and dialogue as needed for storytelling purposes. Some of the dialogue was taken from words written, often years or even decades later, by the actual people involved, and rearranged for dramatic effect.

The central departure from history is that the separation from Great Britain was accomplished in two steps: the actual vote for independence came on July 2 with the approval of Lee's resolution of independence. The wording of the Declaration of Independence—the statement to the world as to the reasons necessitating the split—was then debated for three days before being approved on July 4. The vote for independence did not hinge on some passages being removed from the Declaration, as implied in the play, since Congress had already voted in favor of independence before debating the Declaration. For the sake of drama, the play's authors combined the two events. In addition, some historians believe that the Declaration was not signed on July 4, as shown in 1776, but was instead signed on August 2, 1776. The authors of 1776 had the delegates sign the Declaration on July 4 for dramatic reasons.

Of the four principal characters, the musical also notably focuses on Jefferson's wife, Martha, and Adams' wife, Abigail, but omits Dickinson's wife, Mary Norris, who was actually in Philadelphia at the time, unlike the other wives, and had a different perspective than the other wives. Franklin's common-law wife, Deborah Read, was deceased at this point, and his mistresses are not depicted, although he does mention a "Rendez-vous" he has to attend to.

Many characters in 1776 differ from their historical counterparts. Central to the drama is the depiction of John Adams as "obnoxious and disliked". According to biographer David McCullough, however, Adams was one of the most respected members of Congress in 1776. Adams' often-quoted description of himself in Congress as "obnoxious, suspected, and unpopular" is from a letter written 46 years later, in 1822, after his unpopular presidency had likely colored his view of the past. According to McCullough, no delegate described Adams as obnoxious in 1776.  Historian Garry Wills earlier made a similar argument, writing that "historians relay John Adams's memories without sufficient skepticism", and that it was Dickinson, not Adams, who was advocating an unpopular position in 1776.

Dickinson, who refused to sign Adams' and Jefferson's declaration based on "rights of man" and "natural law", was seeking to avoid reopening issues from the English Civil Wars, including Oliver Cromwell's Puritan regime, and the Jacobitism cause. In 1689, these issues had been definitively resolved in the Glorious Revolution and the constitutionalization of the English Bill of Rights based in "rights and responsibilities of person"; the word "man" is not used except in the context of treason. The last Jacobite rebellion, seeking to re-establish Catholicism and the religious concept of "natural law", had only just happened in 1745, however. None of this background of Dickinson's position is depicted. (Dickinson would later draft the Articles of Confederation, a codification of the Continental Congress system that governed the United States until the present United States Constitution supplanted it; the Articles draw upon the "rights and responsibilities of person" language.)

For practical and dramatic purposes, the play does not depict all of the more than 50 members of Congress who were present at the time. The John Adams of the play is, in part, a composite character, combining the real Adams with his cousin Samuel Adams, who was in Congress at the time but is not depicted in the play (though he is mentioned). Although the play depicts Caesar Rodney as an elderly man near death from skin cancer (which would eventually kill him), he was just 47 at the time and continued to be very active in the Revolution after signing the Declaration. He was not absent from the voting because of health; however, the play is accurate in having him arrive "in the nick of time", having ridden 80 miles the night before (an event depicted on Delaware's 1999 State Quarter). In the play, Richard Henry Lee announces that he is returning to Virginia to serve as governor. He was never governor; his cousin Henry Lee III (who is anachronistically called "General 'Lighthorse' Harry Lee", a rank and nickname earned later) did eventually become governor and would also become the father of Confederate General Robert E. Lee. John Adams was also depicted in the play and the film as disliking Richard Henry Lee. That is not the case as, according to David McCullough, Adams expressed nothing but "respect and admiration for the tall, masterly Virginian." He did, however, contrary to what was portrayed in the play and the film, dislike Benjamin Franklin. Martha Jefferson never traveled to Philadelphia to be with her husband. In fact, she was extremely ill during the summer of 1776, having just endured a miscarriage. The play's authors invented the scene "to show something of the young Jefferson's life without destroying the unity of setting." James Wilson was not the indecisive milquetoast depicted in the play. The real Wilson, who was not yet a judge in 1776, had been cautious about supporting independence at an earlier date, but he supported the resolution of independence when it came up for a vote. Pennsylvania's deciding swing vote was actually cast by John Morton, who is not depicted in the musical.

The quote attributed to Edmund Burke by Dr. Lyman Hall in a key scene with John Adams is a paraphrase of a real quote by Burke.

The song "Cool Considerate Men" is anachronistic because the terms "right" and "left" in politics were not in use until the French Revolution of 1789. John Dickinson, who is portrayed as an antagonist here, was motivated mainly by his Quaker roots and his respect for the British Constitution, having lived in England for 3 years in the 1750s. He was no wealthier than some members of the pro-Independence faction, and freed his slaves in 1777. Thomas Jefferson wrote that "his name will be consecrated in history as one of the great worthies of the revolution".

The musical also deviates from history in its portrayal of attitudes about slavery. In 1776, after a dramatic debate over slavery, the southern delegates walk out in protest of the Declaration's reference to the slave trade, and only support independence when that language is removed from the Declaration. The walkout is fictional, and apparently most delegates, northern and southern, supported the deletion of the clause.

The musical claims that Edward Rutledge led the opposition to the supposedly anti-slavery clause in the original draft of the Declaration. This is inaccurate on two counts. First, the musical does not mention the motivation of the clause, namely the fact that, following Lord Dunmore's Proclamation, England was granting freedom to runaway slaves who joined its army. Second, Rutledge's leadership against the clause is completely fictional. According to Jefferson, the clause was opposed by South Carolina and Georgia, plus unspecified "northern brethren"; that is the limit of known information about opposition to the clause.

Thomas Jefferson is depicted as saying that he has resolved to free his slaves, something he did not do, except for a few slaves freed after his death 50 years later. Franklin claims that he is the founder of an abolitionist organization, but the real Franklin did not become an active abolitionist until after the American Revolution, becoming president of the Pennsylvania Abolition Society in 1785.

James Wilson is portrayed as subordinating himself to Dickinson's opposition to independence, only changing his vote so that he would not be remembered unfavorably. In fact, Wilson was considered one of the leading thinkers behind the American cause, consistently supporting and arguing for independence, although he would not cast his vote until his district had been caucused.

The phrase "We are about to brave the storm in a skiff made of paper", placed in the mouth of John Hancock, was actually stated by John Dickinson ("Others strenuously assert...we ought to brave the Storm in a Skiff made of Paper.") in his arguments against independence.

In both the play and the film, John Adams sarcastically predicts that Benjamin Franklin will receive from posterity too great a share of credit for the Revolution.  "Franklin smote the ground and out sprang—George Washington. Fully grown, and on his horse.  Franklin then electrified them with his magnificent lightning rod and the three of them—Franklin, Washington, and the horse—conducted the entire Revolution all by themselves."  Adams did make a similar comment about Franklin in April 1790, just after Franklin's death, although the mention of the horse was a humorous twist added by the authors of the musical.

The 2022 revival production includes an excerpt of Abigail Adams' March 1776 letter to John Adams, known for its "remember the ladies" statement for women's rights.

Critical reception 
In his review of the original 1969 production, Clive Barnes of The New York Times wrote, On the face of it, few historical incidents seem more unlikely to spawn a Broadway musical than that solemn moment in the history of mankind, the signing of the Declaration of Independence. Yet 1776... most handsomely demonstrated that people who merely go 'on the face of it' are occasionally outrageously wrong....  [1776] is a most striking, most gripping musical. I recommend it without reservation. It makes even an Englishman's heart beat faster... the characters are most unusually full... for Mr. Stone's book is literate, urbane and, on occasion, very amusing....  William Daniels has given many persuasive performances in the past, but nothing, I think, can have been so effective as his John Adams here.  This is a beautiful mixture of pride, ambition, an almost priggish sense of justice and yet – the saving grace of the character – an ironic self-awareness.

John Chapman of the New York Daily News wrote, This is by no means a historical tract or a sermon on the birth of this nation. It is warm with a life of its own; it is funny, it is moving... Often, as I sat enchanted in my seat, it reminded me of Gilbert and Sullivan in its amused regard of human frailties....  The songs and lyrics are, as I have indicated, remarkably original.

The New York Post noted, In this cynical age, it requires courage as well as enterprise to do a musical play that simply deals with the events leading up to the signing of the Declaration of Independence.  And 1776... makes no attempt to be satirical or wander off into modern bypaths.  But the rewards of this confidence reposed in the bold conception were abundant.  The result is a brilliant and remarkably moving work of theatrical art... it is Mr. Daniels' John Adams who dominates the evening, as he did the Congress.  Peter Hunt's direction, the choreography of Onna White, and the setting by Jo Mielziner are just right.

Recordings 
 Original Broadway cast (Columbia, 1969), available on LP, Cassette and CD with Rex Everhart as Ben Franklin because of Howard da Silva's ill health at the time of recording.
 Original London cast (1970), available on LP
 British studio cast (1970), available on LP (Marble Arch MALS-1327)
 Original motion picture soundtrack (Columbia, 1972), available on LP, Cassette
 Studio cast (The Ray Bloch Singers) (date unknown), available on LP
 Broadway revival cast (1997), available on CD, Cassette

Awards and nominations

Original Broadway production 

(Note: William Daniels, who starred as John Adams, was ruled ineligible for the Best Actor nomination because his name was not billed above the title of the show. He was nominated for Best Featured Actor, but refused the nomination.)

1997 Broadway revival

Film adaptation 

The 1972 film version of 1776 was produced by Jack L. Warner with Hunt again directing and Stone writing the screenplay. The film featured William Daniels as Adams, Ken Howard as Jefferson, Howard da Silva as Franklin, John Cullum as Edward Rutledge, Ron Holgate as Richard Henry Lee, and Virginia Vestoff as Abigail Adams, all of whom had performed their roles on Broadway.  The supporting cast was also mostly recruited from the Broadway production. The principal exceptions were Donald Madden and Blythe Danner, who took over the roles of John Dickinson and Martha Jefferson.

A Director's Cut of the original film has been released on DVD and Blu-ray.  Both the look and sound of the original film have been improved through modern technology.  Many cuts to the original film by the producer Jack Warner have been restored, including verses from the songs "Piddle Twiddle and Resolve" and "He Plays the Violin" and the entire "Cool, Cool, Considerate Men".  Musical underscoring has been removed from several scenes without songs in order to strengthen the focus on dialogue. Bonus material includes commentary by Director Peter Hunt and by Peter Stone, the book/screenwriter. Among other topics, they discuss artistic liberties and anachronisms used to dramatize the events.

In popular culture 
Throughout the course of the third season of the Netflix original series Grace and Frankie, Robert, played by Martin Sheen, and his husband Sol, played by Sam Waterston, are persuaded to audition for a local production of 1776 by the local gay men's theater group, resulting in Robert landing the lead role of John Adams, much to the disappointment of Sol who was not cast.

The musical Hamilton references the song "Sit Down, John!" in a lyric from the song, "The Adams Administration", in the lyric: "Adams fires Hamilton/Privately calls him "creole bastard" in his taunts/Say what?/Hamilton publishes his response/Sit down, John, you fat mother." Lin-Manuel Miranda discovered the 1776 film in college and cites it as having paved the way for Hamilton.

See also 
List of the longest-running Broadway shows
List of plays and musicals about the American Revolution
Hamilton (musical), a 2015 musical about Alexander Hamilton
 Founding Fathers of the United States

References

Bibliography 
Stone, Peter, and Sherman Edwards. 1776: A Musical Play. New York: Viking Press, 1970. .
Bloom, Ken and Vlastnik, Frank. Broadway Musicals: The 101 Greatest Shows of all Time. New York: Black Dog & Leventhal Publishers, 2004. 
Kantor, Michael and Maslon, Laurence. Broadway: The American Musical. New York: Bullfinch Press, 2004.

External links 
 
 
 
 1776 at the Music Theatre International website
 Rational Magic review of stage version and CD
 Classroom Study Integrating Musical Theatre in the classroom, JoAnne Freed
1776 music tracks on Masterworks Broadway
 2016 City Center conversation with William Daniels and Lin-Manuel Miranda about the legacy of 1776.

1969 musicals
Fiction set in 1776
Plays set in the United States
Broadway musicals
Musicals inspired by real-life events
Musicals by Peter Stone
Plays set in Pennsylvania
Plays set in the 18th century
Tony Award for Best Musical
United States Declaration of Independence
Plays about the American Revolution
Cultural depictions of Benjamin Franklin
Cultural depictions of Thomas Jefferson
Cultural depictions of John Adams
Cultural depictions of John Hancock
American patriotic songs
Tony Award-winning musicals